M. nivalis may refer to:
 Microtus nivalis, a vole species
 Monographella nivalis, a plant pathogen species
 Montifringilla nivalis, a small passerine bird species
 Mustela nivalis, a weasel species
 Mycosphaerella nivalis, a fungus species